Boneh Razi (also Romanized as Boneh Rāzī; also known as Benehzārī) is a village in Javaran Rural District, Hanza District, Rabor County, Kerman Province, Iran. At the 2006 census, its population was 41, in 13 families.

References 

Populated places in Rabor County